Wedding Tayo, Wedding Hindi is a  2011 Filipino comedy film starring Toni Gonzaga and Eugene Domingo. It was released by Star Cinema. The film premiered on August 31, 2011.

The film is about two people trying to discover the significance of marriage, love and relationships.

Cast and characters

Main cast
Toni Gonzaga as Maribelle "Belay" Bautista
Eugene Domingo as Preciosa "Precy" Matias
Zanjoe Marudo as Oscar "Oca" Baytion
Wendell Ramos as Benito "Ben" Matias

Supporting cast
Sylvia Sanchez as Yolanda "Yolly" Bautista 
Irma Adlawan as Laura Baytion
Nikki Valdez as Mila
Paul Salas as Jay-Z Matias
Miles Ocampo as Karen Matias
Miriam Quiambao as Atty. Lily Vargas
Ramon Christopher as Delfin Bautista
Teddy Corpuz as Elmer Bautista 
Manuel Chua as Bodyok
Anna Luna as Wendy Bautista
Vangie Labanan as Loleng Garbanzos
Odette Khan as Ursula Matias
Lou Veloso as Kanoy Garbanzos
Dominic Ochoa as Atty. Moises
Wendy Valdez as Raquel
Regine Angeles as Jocelyn
Say Alonzo as Donna

Reception
The film premiered nationwide on August 31, 2011. It opened with a Php 16.7 million total of gross receipts in its first five days beating out Zombadings 1: Patayin sa Shokot si Remington in the Philippine box office, which also premiered the same day. Its total gross for its four weeks of showing added up to Php 37.2 million.

References

External links 
 
 Star Cinema Multiply Website

Philippine comedy films
2010s Tagalog-language films
Star Cinema films
OctoArts Films films
2011 films
2011 comedy films
Films directed by José Javier Reyes